Vuelta Ciclista Por Un Chile Líder (Vuelta Líder) was an elite men's professional road bicycle racing stage race held annually in Chile.  The Vuelta Líder was created in 1997 by Líder, the largest supermarket chain in Chile, and was sanctioned by the Chilean Cycling Federation (Federación Ciclista de Chile).  The last race was held in 2007. The Vuelta Líder was the largest cycling race in Chile. When the UCI Continental Circuits were created in 2005, the Vuelta Ciclista Por Un Chile Líder was added to the UCI America Tour schedule.

List of winners 

UCI America Tour races
Cycle races in Chile
Chile
Recurring sporting events disestablished in 2007
Defunct cycling races in Chile
1997 establishments in Chile
2007 disestablishments in Chile